This is a list of the musical compositions of Johann Adolph Hasse 1699–1783) sorted by genre, and then chronologically.

Opera

Oratorios
Il cantico de' tre fanciulli (The Song of the Three Holy Children) (Stefano Benedetto Pallavicino; Dresden 1734)
Le virtù appiè della croce (Stefano Benedetto Pallavicino; Dresden 1737)
Serpentes ignei in deserto (Bonaventura Bonomo; Venice 1740)
Giuseppe riconosciuto (Pietro Metastasio; 1741)
I pellegrini al sepolcro di Nostro Signore (The Pilgrims at the Tomb of Our Lord), Oratorio in 2 parts (Stefano Benedetto Pallavicino; Dresden 1742)
Ci'l un parantê und parsol scelopgrini (Stefano Benedotto Pallavicino, 1744)
La Caduta di Gerico (Giovanni Claudio Pasquini; Dresden 1745)
Santa Elena al Calvario (Pietro Metastasio; 1747, second version 1772)
La conversione di Sant' Agostino (The Conversion of Saint Augustine), Oratorio in 2 parts (Maria Antonia Walpurgis von Sachsen; Dresden 1750)
S. Petrus et S. Maria Magdalena; Venice 1758)

Cantatas and ballads
Chieggio ai gigli ed alle rose (Pietro Metastasio; Naples 1727/1729)
Il nome or Scrivo in te l'amato nome (Pietro Metastasio; Naples 1727/1729)
È ver, mia Fille, è vero (Pietro Metastasio; Naples 1727/1729)
L'Armonica or Ah perché col canto mio (with glass harmonica) (Pietro Metastasio; Vienna 1769)
La Gelosia (Pietro Metastasio; Vienna 1769)
Il Ciclope (Pietro Metastasio; Venice 1775/1776)
La Danza (Pietro Metastasio; Venice 1775/1776)
Ah, Troppo è Ver
Bella, Mi Parto
Bell' Aurora
Clori, Clori, mia vita
Euridice e Orfeo – cantata a due
Per palesarti appieno
Se il cantor trace, oh Dio
Quel vago seno
Fille dolce, mio bene
Venetian Ballads for the German flute, violin or harpsichord (London, 1735)
Cosa e' sta Cossa?
Grazie agli inganni tuoi
No ste' a condanarme
Si', la gondola avere', no crie'

Church music
Litaniae Lauretanae in F minor
Liltaniae Lauretanae in G major
Magnificat in F major
Missa in D minor (1751)
Miserere in D minor
Miserere in F major
Miserere in C minor
Missa in E-flat (1779)
Missa ultima in G minor (Venice, 1783)
Regina coeli in D major
Requiem in C major (Dresden, 1763)
Requiem in E-flat major (Dresden, 1764)
Salve Regina in A major (1736)
Salve Regina in E-flat major
Salve Regina in F major
Salve Regina in G major (1744)
Regina Coeli in D major
Sub tuum praesidium in B-flat major
Sub tuum praesidium in C minor
Te Deum in D major (1751)
Te Deum in G major (1776)
Venite pastores. Motetto pastorale

For vespers
Domine ad adjuvandum me festina in C major
Dixit Dominus (Psalm 109) in C major
Dixit Dominus (Psalm 109) in G major
Confitebor (Psalm 110) in F major
Beatus vir (Psalm 111) in A minor
Laudate pueri (Psalm 112) in A major

Instrumental music
Six sonatas for cembalo (pianoforte)
Six trio sonatas, Op. 2, Amsterdam: Witvogel 1730, Paris: Le Clerc, n.d. (=Op. 1, c. 1735, London: John Walsh)
Sonata I in E minor
Sonata II in C major (=QV 2 Anh. 1 by Quantz)
Sonata III in A major
Sonata IV in G major
Sonata V in E major
Sonata VI in D major (=QV 2 Anh. 7 by Quantz)
Six violin sonatas
Six concertos for organ solo (J. Walsh, London, ca. 1743)
Concerto No. 1 in F major
Concerto No. 2 in G major
Concerto No. 3 in G major
Concerto No. 4 in D major
Concerto No. 5 in F major
Concerto No. 6 in D major
Cello Concerto in D major
Flute Concerto in D major
Flute Concerto in B minor
Concerto for Two Flutes in G major
Oboe Concerto in F major
Mandolin Concerto in G major
6 Sonatas or trios for 2 flutes or violins and continuo (London, 1739) = Op. 3, London: J. Oswald, n.d. (ca.1757).
Solos for a German flute or violin, with a through bass for the harpsichord or violoncello, Op. 2 (London, 1740)
12 Concertos for flute, strings and continuo, Op. 3 (London, 1741)
6 Concertos for violins, French horns or oboes & c. with a thorough bass for harpsichord or violoncello in eight parts, Op. 4 (London, 1741)
Solos for flute or violin, Op. 5 (London, 1744)
6 Sinfonias, Op. 5
6 Sonatas for harpsichord, Op. 7 (London, 1758)

Sources
Carus-Verlag critical edition of Hasse works Carus-Verlag. Accessed 30 January 2009.

External links
 

 
Lists of compositions by composer